FKAB, Fartygskonstruktioner AB, is Sweden's largest consulting firm specializing in ship design and ship construction. FKAB, which was founded in 1961, has 40 employees in Sweden and over 50 employees in China. FKAB designs all types of commercial ships and boats from pilot boats to 174 000 dwt bulk carriers.

External links
 Company website

Boat and ship designers
Shipbuilding companies of Sweden
Companies based in Västra Götaland County
Consulting firms of Sweden